The Order of the National Hero is the highest honour that can be given by the government of the Bahamas. It was founded in 2016. The first dedicatees of the Order were Sir Lynden Oscar Pindling, Sir Roland Theodore Symonette, Sir Milo Boughton Butler, and Sir Cecil Vincent Wallace-Whitfield, all of whom were granted the Order posthumously on July 10, 2018. Members are accorded the style "The Right Excellent" and also entitled to place the post-nominal letters "N.H". after their name.

References

Orders, decorations, and medals of the Bahamas
Awards established in 2016
2016 establishments in the Bahamas